Ali Lemghaifry (born 1975) is a Mauritanian football referee. He was born in Nouadhibou (Dakhlet NDB), the second biggest city in Mauritania. He has a degree in accounting .

Lemghaifry became a FIFA referee in 2005. He has officiated at the 2011 African Nations Championship and the 2014 FIFA World Cup qualifiers.

References

External links 
 
 

1975 births
Living people
Mauritanian football referees
People from Dakhlet Nouadhibou Region